Fruits (stylized "FRUiTS") was a monthly Japanese street fashion magazine founded in 1997 by photographer Shoichi Aoki. Though FRUiTS covered styles found throughout Tokyo, it is associated most closely with the fashion subcultures found in Tokyo's Harajuku district. The magazine primarily focused on individual styles found outside the fashion-industry mainstream, as well as subcultures specific to Japan, such as lolita and ganguro, and local interpretations of larger subcultures like punk and goth.

Content
FRUiTS featured a simple layout, with the bulk of the magazine made up of single full-page photographs accompanied by a brief profile of the photographed person, which included their age, occupation, and a description of what brands they were wearing (if applicable), as well as their self-described "point of fashion" (style inspiration). Most issues included only a couple of advertisements, and typically only for local businesses. Occasional special-edition issues of FRUiTS also included more extensive profiles of frequently photographed people, or reader-created artwork.

Worldwide reception 
FRUiTS helped lead Western interest in Japanese fashion as some of its photographs became first popular in the fashion community, then synonymous with Japanese fashion in the West. 

A selection of photographs from its earlier issues were showcased in the books Fruits (2001) and Fresh Fruits (2005), both published by Phaidon Press. An exhibition of Aoki's photographs for the magazine, developed by the Powerhouse Museum, has toured museums in Australia and New Zealand.

Closure 
After 20 years and 233 issues, Shoichi Aoki announced in February 2017 that FRUiTS magazine would cease publication effective immediately because "there are no more cool kids to photograph".

See also
Japanese street fashion
Japanese fashion as social resistance
Street fashion
Street photography

References

External links
Official site
The editor of FRUiTS magazine on the rise and fall of Harajuku, i-D Japan
Photographer Shoichi Aoki on capturing Tokyo fashion, CNN
Fruits Fan Community
Fruits Exhibition at the Powerhouse in Sydney

1997 establishments in Japan
2017 disestablishments in Japan
Defunct magazines published in Japan
Fashion magazines published in Japan
Japanese subcultures
Magazines established in 1997
Magazines disestablished in 2017
Magazines published in Tokyo
Monthly magazines published in Japan
Shibuya